Bucculatrix kogii is a moth in the family Bucculatricidae. It was described by Shigeki Kobayashi, Toshiya Hirowatari and Hiroshi Kuroko in 2010. It is found in Japan (Hokkaido).

The wingspan is 7–8 mm. The forewings are white with dark brown irrorations. The hindwings are grey.

Etymology
The species is named for Mr. Kogi, who collected the holotype.

References

Natural History Museum Lepidoptera generic names catalog

Bucculatricidae
Moths described in 2010
Moths of Japan